In mathematical logic, specifically in graph theory and number theory, the Buchholz hydra game is a type of hydra game, which is a single-player game based on the idea of chopping pieces off a mathematical tree.

Rules 
The game is played on a hydra, a finite, rooted connected mathematical tree  with the following properties:

 The root of  has a special label, usually denoted .
 Any other node of  has a label .
 All nodes directly above the root of  have a label .

The definition of  depends on the label of :

In this case, the value of  does not matter.

A series of moves is called a strategy, and a strategy is called a winning strategy if, after a (finite) amount of moves, nothing is left of the hydra except its root. It has proven that this always terminates, even though the hydra can get taller by massive amounts. However, it does take a significant amount of time.

Hydra theorem 
Buchholz's paper in 1987 showed the canonical correspondence from a hydra to an infinitary well-founded tree (or the corresponding term in the notation system  associated to Buchholz's function, which does not necessarily belong to the ordinal notation system ), preserves fundamental sequences, i.e. the strategy to choose the rightmost leaves and the  operation on an infinitary well-founded tree (or the  operation on the corresponding term in ).

BH(n) 
Suppose a tree consists of just one branch with  nodes, labelled . Call such a tree . It cannot be proven in  that for all , there exists  such that  is a winning strategy.

Define  as the smallest  such that  as defined above is a winning strategy. Hydras grow extremely fast, because the amount of turns required to kill  is larger than Graham's number or even the amount of turns to kill a Kirby-Paris hydra; and  has an entire Kirby-Paris hydra as its branch. To be precise, its rate of growth is believed to be comparable to  with respect to unspecified system of fundamental sequences without a proof.

Similarly to the tree function,  is very large, but not extremely.

The Buchholz hydra eventually surpasses TREE(n) and SCG(n), yet it is likely weaker than loader.c as well as numbers from finite promise games.

Analysis 

It is possible to make one-to-one correspondence between some hydras and ordinals. To convert a tree or subtree to an ordinal:

 Inductively convert all the immediate children of the node to ordinals.
 Add up those child ordinals. If there were no children, this will be 0.

The resulting ordinal expression is only useful if it is in normal form. Some examples are:

References 

 
 

 

 



Trees (graph theory)
Mathematical games
Large numbers
Ordinal numbers
Theorems in discrete mathematics